Wellington Carlos da Silva (born 5 October 1987) is a Brazilian footballer who last played as a striker for Feirense.

Career 
After having played for Sertãozinho in his country, Wellington moved abroad, signing for Romanian club Concordia on 27 June 2012. He was a victim of a racial abuse during a match in September 2014 against Rapid București with a banana being thrown at him. One week later, the fan who threw the banana apologised and Wellington reportedly promised to give him a signed Jersey besides accepting a public apology. In April 2015, it was announced that he demanded an early termination of his contract so that he could return to Brazil for treatment of an injury. On 29 April 2015, he officially terminated his contract after spending three seasons with it during which he scored 19 goals.

On 24 June 2015, Wellington moved to Pandurii of the same league, penning a one year deal. After having scored a single goal for the club, he switched clubs and countries, signing for Cypriot club AEL Limassol on 9 May 2016. On 31 January 2017, he joined Portuguese club Feirense.

References

External links

1987 births
Living people
Brazilian footballers
Association football forwards
CS Concordia Chiajna players
CS Pandurii Târgu Jiu players
AEL Limassol players
C.D. Feirense players
Liga I players
Cypriot First Division players
Primeira Liga players
Brazilian expatriate footballers
Expatriate footballers in Romania
Brazilian expatriate sportspeople in Romania
Expatriate footballers in Cyprus
Brazilian expatriate sportspeople in Cyprus
Expatriate footballers in Portugal
Brazilian expatriate sportspeople in Portugal
People from Ribeirão Preto
Footballers from São Paulo (state)